Fast Money is the second studio album by American rapper Birdman. It was released on June 21, 2005, by Cash Money Records. The album debuted at number 9 on the Billboard 200, with first-week sales of 65,000 copies in the United States.

Track listing

Charts

References

External links
 

Birdman (rapper) albums
Cash Money Records albums
2004 albums
Albums produced by Mannie Fresh